Fabio Mangone (1587–1629) was an Italian architect.

Born in Caravaggio, he was a pupil of Alessandro Bisnati, and succeeded him as architect for the Duomo of Milan. Later he was professor architecture at the Accademia Ambrosiana.

He was assisted by Francesco Maria Richini and others in the rebuilding of the famous Biblioteca Ambrosiana, centering on the large classical enclosed courtyards (1608) of the Collegio Elvetico (now Archivio di Stato or state archives), commissioned by the cardinal Federico Borromeo. The two courtyards are surrounded by a double columns. The facade was completed by Richini. The sculpture on the facade is by Dionigi Bussola. He also worked on the completion of the church of San Sebastiano in Milan.

He died at Milan.

References

External links

 

1587 births
1629 deaths
People from Caravaggio, Lombardy
Italian Baroque architects